The R325 is a Regional Route in South Africa that connects Griquatown to Upington and Kuruman.

External links
 Routes Travel Info

References

Regional Routes in the Northern Cape